Charlottenlund Church is a parish church of the Church of Norway in Trondheim municipality in Trøndelag county, Norway. It is located in the Charlottenlund neighborhood, east of downtown part of the city of Trondheim. It is one of the churches for the Ranheim og Charlottenlund parish which is part of the Strinda prosti (deanery) in the Diocese of Nidaros. The red brick church was built in a long church style in 1973 by the architect Roar Tønseth. The church seats about 350 people.

See also
List of churches in Nidaros

References

Churches in Trondheim
Churches in Trøndelag
Long churches in Norway
Brick churches in Norway
20th-century Church of Norway church buildings
Churches completed in 1973
1973 establishments in Norway